The 1952 United States presidential election in California took place on November 4, 1952 as part of the 1952 United States presidential election. State voters chose 32 representatives, or electors, to the Electoral College, who voted for president and vice president.

California voted for the Republican nominee, former Allied Supreme Commander Dwight D. Eisenhower, in a landslide over the Democratic nominee, Illinois Governor Adlai Stevenson.  , this is the last time that Yolo County has voted Republican in a presidential election, the longest Republican drought for any county in the state.

This was the first presidential election in which any nominee received over a million votes in Los Angeles County.

Results

Results by county

References

California
1952
Presidential election in California